Kedamangalam Sadanandan (1926 – 13 April 2008) was a Kadhaprasangam artist, actor, screenwriter and lyricist from Kerala. He performed Kadhaprasangam (story telling) in more than 15,000 stages for over 50,000 hours in a career spanning about 64 years. He wrote scripts for 12 films, lyrics for more than hundred films and acted in about 40 films. He received the Kerala Sangeetha Nataka Akademi Fellowship in 1981.

Biography
Kedamangalam Sadanandan was born in Paravur, Kerala, in December 1926. He debuted on stage as a monodramatist in 1944. During his early years, he performed famous poems including Changampuzha's Vazhakkula and Ramanan. Ramanan alone was performed in 3,476 stages. Another one was Unniarcha, the Ezhava dame who humbled the rapacious Jonaka gang with mastery over sword fight.

Sadanandan ruled the stage for 64 years as a Kadhaprasangam artiste and he presented over 40 stories for over 50,000 hours on 15,000 stages. He also acted in 40 films, scripted 12 films and wrote songs for about 100 movies. Despite age related infirmities, he continued his vocation till his last years. He died on 13 April 2008 due to lung cancer.

Filmography
 Sreemurukan (1977)
 Amba Ambika Ambalika (1976)
 Hridayam Oru Kshethram (1976)
 Thomasleeha (1975)
 Swami Ayappan (1975)
 Chandrakantham (1974)
 Sree Guruvayoorappan (1972)
 Sree Guruvayoorappan (1964)
 Devalayam (1964)
 Veluthampi Dawala (1962)
 Viyarppinte Vila (1962)
 Kandam Becha Kottu (1961) as Avuran
 Umminithanka (1961)
 Arappavan (1961) as Pachu Pilla 
 Thaskaraveeran (1957)
 Marumakal (1952)

References

External links
 Kedamangalam Sadanandan at the Malayalam Movie Database
 Kedamangalam Sadanandan at MSI
 An article on Kadhaprasangam

Malayalam-language writers
People from Ernakulam district
1926 births
2008 deaths
Indian storytellers
Male actors in Malayalam cinema
Indian male film actors
Male actors from Kerala
Malayalam screenwriters
Malayalam poets
20th-century Indian dramatists and playwrights
Screenwriters from Kerala
Malayalam-language lyricists
Indian male poets
Indian male screenwriters
20th-century Indian poets
Male actors in Malayalam theatre
20th-century Indian male actors
Indian male stage actors
20th-century Indian male writers
20th-century Indian screenwriters
Deaths from lung cancer in India
Recipients of the Kerala Sangeetha Nataka Akademi Fellowship